Indian History Congress is the largest professional and academic body of Indian historians with over 35,000 members. It was established in 1935. The name of any new applicant for membership needs to be proposed and seconded by existing Ordinary or Life Members.

History
The lead to establish an all-India national congress of historians was taken by Poona historians during the period of British colonial rule. The first session took place in Bharat Itihas Sanshodhak Mandal, Poona, in 1935. Historians such as Datto Vaman Potdar, Surendra Nath Sen (who later became the first director of National Archives of India), and Sir Shafaat Ahmad Khan attended the first session.

Historians Mohammad Habib and Susobhan Sarkar and later Nurul Hasan, Ram Sharan Sharma, Radha Krishna Chaudhary, Satish Chandra, Bipan Chandra, Romila Thapar, Irfan Habib, Athar Ali, Barun De, Iqtidar Alam Khan, B. N. Mukherjee, K. N. Panikkar, Brajadulal Chattopadhayay, Dwijendra Narayan Jha, Sumit Sarkar, Sabyasachi Bhattacharya and Pritam Saini  have had a long association with the Indian History Congress.

Awards
H.K. Barpujari Award

1985: Sumit Sarkar
1987: M. Athar Ali
1989: R.S. Sharma
1991: S. Settar
1993: No Award
2017: Sabyasachi Bhattacharya

Vishwanath Kashinath Rajwade Award (for lifelong service and contribution to Indian history)

2002: R.S. Sharma

References

External links
 

Historiography of India
1935 establishments in India
Organizations established in 1935
Professional associations based in India
History organisations based in India